The Windecker YE-5A was an experimental aircraft evaluated by the U.S. Air Force.

It was an all-composite construction aircraft, based on the commercial single-engine, low-wing Windecker Eagle. The YE-5A, delivered in 1973, was used in tests relating to the radar detectability (commonly known as 'stealth') of composite aircraft. A single YE-5A (serial number 73-1653) was built. The YE-5A composite airframe benefited from the U.S. Army project and was shown to be difficult to detect using radar; however other components, including the metal engine, could be seen on radar. The YE-5A was destroyed in a crash during a classified project in 1985, and was replaced by a modified conventional civilian model Windecker Eagle (N4196G), to complete the project. This aircraft is disassembled and in storage in the United States Army Aviation Museum at Fort Rucker, Alabama.

Project CADDO

The U.S. Air Force tests were preceded by tests of a nearly similar prototype, which was delivered to the U.S. Army in 1972. This aircraft was code-named CADDO and tested at Aberdeen Proving Ground. The U.S. Army acquired another Eagle in 1974, which was used for ballistic tests. The U.S. Army Eagle was also used in tests for the U.S. Air Force. Ultimately this aircraft (N803WR) was destroyed by a tornado in 1980.

Specifications (YE-5A)

References

E-5, Windecker
E-5
Stealth aircraft
Low-wing aircraft
Single-engined tractor aircraft
Aircraft first flown in 1973